Disc Room is a 2020 action puzzle video game in which the player navigates a series of labyrinthine rooms while avoiding bullet hell-style projectiles. Each room has its own patterns but is not predictable between rooms.

Development 

The game was announced in February 2020 and released on October 22, 2020, for Linux, macOS, Nintendo Switch, and Windows, for Amazon Luna in December 2021, and for Xbox One on June 7, 2022.

Reception 

Disc Room received "generally favorable" reviews, according to review aggregator Metacritic.

References

Further reading 

 
 

2020 video games
Devolver Digital games
Action video games
Indie video games
Linux games
MacOS games
Nintendo Switch games
Puzzle video games
Single-player video games
Video games developed in Brazil
Video games developed in the Netherlands
Windows games